Oscar II Coast is that portion of the east coast of the Antarctic Peninsula between Cape Fairweather to the north, and Cape Alexander to the south. Discovered in 1893 by Captain C.A. Larsen, who named it for King Oscar II of Norway and Sweden. To the north of this coast is Nordenskjöld Coast.

Further reading 
 Alan Nairn, The South Atlantic, Volume 1, P 192 
 Gunter Faure, Teresa M. Mensing, The Transantarctic Mountains: Rocks, Ice, Meteorites and Water, P 9
 R. L. Oliver, P. R. James, J. B. Jago, Antarctic Earth Science, P 329
 Amin Beiranvand Pour, Mazlan Hashim, Yongcheol Park and Jong Kuk Hong, MAPPING ALTERATION ZONES IN INACCESSIBLE REGIONS USING TARGET DETECTION ALGORITHMS TO SWIR BANDS OF ASTER REMOTE SENSING DATA

References 

 
Coasts of Graham Land